Tone Žnidaršič (5 November 1923 – 9 April 2007) was a Slovene painter and sculptor who also illustrated children's books and textbooks.

He won the Levstik Award in 1964 for his illustrations for the primary school textbook Nauk o človeku (On the Human Body).

References

Slovenian male painters
Slovenian illustrators
1923 births
2007 deaths
Levstik Award laureates
University of Ljubljana alumni
20th-century Slovenian painters
20th-century Slovenian male artists
People from the Municipality of Dobrepolje
Yugoslav painters